Rekha, popularly known as "Sparsha" Rekha is a Kannada actress. She turned producer with the film Demo Piece (2020).

Filmography

Television Shows

References

Living people
Indian film actresses
Kannada actresses
Year of birth missing (living people)